Jack Mathis (born June 12, 1992) is an American professional soccer player who plays as a midfielder for the Premier Development League team, Saint Louis FC U23. He also serves as an assistant coach for Saint Louis FC U23.

Career

College
Mathis played college soccer at Drury University from 2011 to 2014.

Professional
On March 13, 2015, Saint Louis FC of the USL announced the signing of Mathis.

References

Living people
1992 births
American soccer players
Saint Louis FC players
Association football midfielders
Soccer players from Missouri
USL Championship players